Tiw Valley is a valley lying eastward of Odin Valley in the Asgard Range, Victoria Land. The feature is one in a group in this range named from Norse mythology, Tiw being the god of rules and regulations in war and peace. The name was suggested by Advisory Committee on Antarctic Names (US-ACAN) in consultation with the New Zealand Antarctic Place-Names Committee (NZ-APC).

Valleys of Victoria Land
McMurdo Dry Valleys